WWWA may refer to:

 World Welfare Works Association
 World Wide Wrestling Alliance
 World Women's Wrestling Association, a part of All Japan Women's Pro-Wrestling
 WWWA (FM), a radio station (95.3 FM) licensed to Winslow, Maine, United States